Satyadev or Satyadeo is an Indian given name. The name means 'lord of truth'. Notable people with the name include:
Satyadeo
Satyadeo Narain Arya, Indian politician from the BJP party in Bihar
Satyadeo Ram, left-wing Indian politician of Bihar
Satyadeow Sawh (1955–2006), Hindu politician in Guyana

Satyadev
Satyadev Dubey (1936–2011), Indian theatre director, actor, playwright, screenwriter, and film actor and director
Satyadev Katare (1955–2016), Indian politician of Madhya Pradesh
Satyadev Kushwaha, Indian politician from the JDU party in Bihar
Satyadev Pachauri, Indian politician of Uttar Pradesh
Satyadev Prasad (born 1979), Indian archer
Satyadev Kancharana, Telugu actor

References

Hindu given names
Indian masculine given names